Kryoburn is an American industrial metal band.

Biography
Formed in 1995, Kryoburn began to amass a following in the local Carlsbad metal scene that over time allowed them to grow to the national level. They toured the United States continually from 2000, gaining an ever-increasing fanbase along the way. They have garnered critical acclaim from heavy metal publication Metal Maniac 's December 2005 edition. Kryoburn released their debut album, Enigmatic Existence, on Candlelight Records in 2005. In May 2009, the band revamped their Myspace site with material from their upcoming album, Three Years Eclipsed. After a change in line up and other setbacks, joining the band was Allen Scott on guitar/vocals and Sam Logan on synthesizer and keyboards.  Three Years Eclipsed was released on Candlelight Records USA on January 11.

Band members
Todd Brashear - Vocals, Guitars
Les Huber - Vocals, Bass)
Chris Huber - Drums, Samples
Allen Scott - Vocals, Guitars
Sam Logan - Synth and Keys
Jared Pace - Bass
Hunter Correll - Bass, Backing Vocals
Kelly Bogues - Synth and Keys

Discography
 2005 — Enigmatic Existence
 2011 — Three Years Eclipsed

References

External links
BNR Metal Pages
Official Site
Official Myspace Site

Musical groups established in 1995
Heavy metal musical groups from New Mexico
American industrial metal musical groups
Musical quintets